The Moy was a 1,697 ton, iron sailing ship with a length of , breadth of  and depth of . She was primarily used for the transportation of Indian indenture labourers to the colonies. Details of some of these voyages are as follows:

In 1888, the Moy repatriated 327 former indentured labourers from St Lucia back to India.

During her last voyage, to British Guiana, there was an incredibly high death rate with 46 deaths, and of the remainder 88 had to be sent to hospital in Georgetown. The Surgeon Superintendent's gratuity was withheld for this incident and the captain and third officer also lost part of their pay. In February 1905, on the way back to Liverpool from British Guiana she was reported as missing.

See also 
 Indian Indenture Ships to Fiji
 Indian indenture system

References

External links 
Picture of Moy
Indian Immigrant Ship List
Genealogy.com            
The Ships List

History of Guyana
Indian indenture ships to Fiji
Victorian-era passenger ships of the United Kingdom
Individual sailing vessels
1885 ships
Missing ships
Maritime incidents in 1905
Ships lost with all hands
Shipwrecks in the Atlantic Ocean